Yusuf Ibrahim Zailani is a Nigerian politician who is currently serving as Speaker of Kaduna State House of Assembly. Zailani, a member of the ruling All Progressives Congress representing Igabi State Constituency in the Kaduna State assembly was elected speaker on 25 February 2020. Zailani was nominated for the position of speaker by Suleiman Dabo representing Zaria City and seconded by Bako Kantiyok  representing Zonkwa State Constituency following the sudden resignation of the former speaker of the assembly, Aminu Shagali on ‘personal grounds’.

References 

Living people
Politicians from Kaduna State
Year of birth missing (living people)